Anthony Scott Burns (born May 9, 1977) is a Canadian filmmaker, visual effects artist and musician. After starting his film career as a visual effects artist and director, as of 2015 he is directing three feature films in pre-production: Dark Matter, Holidays, and Plan B Entertainment's Alpha. He also releases music under the moniker Pilotpriest. His film,  Our House, was released in 2018.

Career
Anthony Scott Burns was born in Kitchener, Ontario in 1977. He was interested in film at a young age, and began building small models he dubbed "parallel universes". He began working on films at the age of 16, and by 18 was making films, with several of his shorts winning local awards. He is a self-taught director, cinematographer, and animator. At 18, he moved to Toronto where he landed a job at a boutique design firm and later was hired by MTV Canada as Senior Designer. Later on, Burns started directing commercials and performing VFX on multiple shoots. While with MTV, he oversaw the creation and direction of all MTV's on-air interstitials in Canada.

In May 2011, after viewing some of the work Burns had created over the years, Helios Productions announced it had hired Burns to direct a thriller/sci-fi feature entitled Dark Matter, written by Hugh Sterbakov. Filming began in November 2011 in Canada. As of 2012, Burns was based in Toronto. In 2012, he was the visual effects supervisor for The Last Will and Testament of Rosalind Leigh, and that September he released the trailer for Epoch, a short film constructed from footage for a music video. In 2013, he also continued to do commercial shorts and trailers for his then unreleased short narrative film Manifold were released in September 2013. A "tech-noir narrative" and starring Stephen McHattie and Greg Calderone, Manifold premiered in the United States at Fantastic Fest 2013. The online release of Manifold was a Vimeo staff pick, and was named "Short of the Week" at ShortoftheWeek.com in January 2014. In November 2014, he was brought in to direct the sci-fi thriller 'Alpha, which is being produced by Brad Pitt and Plan B Entertainment. In February 2015, XYZ Films hired him, as one of the directors, who will direct the anthology film Holidays, along with directors such as Scott Stewart, Nicholas McCarthy, Kevin Smith.

According to vice.com, Anthony Scott Burns started to direct a film called Breathing, and hired Bronwyn Griffin and Austin Garrick to score it. However, due to differences in creative direction during post-production, Burns left the project, shortly followed by Electric Youth. They then chose to release the 23 tracks score they composed in an album called Breathing (Original Motion Picture Soundtrack From A Lost Film). According to the band, a version of the film is yet to come, but with different editing, different soundtrack and probably a different title. That film is likely to have become Our House.

He was a Canadian Screen Award nominee for Best Director at the 10th Canadian Screen Awards in 2022 for Come True.

Filmography

Discography

References

External links
 Anthony Scott Burns at LinkedIn
 

1977 births
Living people
Film directors from Ontario
Canadian electronic musicians
Musicians from Kitchener, Ontario